The Palmetum of Santa Cruz de Tenerife is a botanical garden of 120.000 m² specialized in palms (Arecaceae) . It is an artificial hill, with views of the ocean, located in Santa Cruz de Tenerife, Canary Islands, Spain. The gardens include a large system of waterfalls, streams and ponds, a museum dedicated to palms, and a display shade house. The project was started in 1995 on a former landfill and only opened to the public in 2014. The valuable palm collection gathers about 600 species of palms and it is focused on the ones native to world islands. Trees and shrubs of other plant families are also displayed, organised in "biogeographical sections". All gardens are maintained with no pesticides and no fertilizers, different species of wild birds are easily seen in the palmetum.

Location 

The palmetum is located in Santa Cruz de Tenerife, capital city of the Western Canary Islands, in the district of Cabo Llanos, by the Parque Marítimo César Manrique. It is an artificial hill originally made of rubbish: a former landfill of the city, by the ocean. The average annual temperature is 21,7 °C and the absolute minimum temperature recorded is 13 °C.

History 
The old landfill was shut in 1983. The creation of the gardens was started in 1995 with funding from the European Union and the City of Santa Cruz de Tenerife, under the botanical direction of the Agronomist Manuel Caballero Ruano and the biologist Carlo Morici. The landscape designer Carlos Simón directed the construction of various lakes and waterfalls and the plantation of the earliest gardens in 1996-1999. The development was paralysed in 2000 for lack of funding. Since then it was kept with basic maintenance until 2006. During 2007 and 2008 some major works were performed in order to push it further. The whole watering system was replaced and the unfinished southern slopes were landscaped. Living collections have been improved and ordered and new geographical sections have been started. More works followed in 2010-2011, with the construction of the entrance building and the hardscaping of roads and circles. While the park was still closed, the first public guided tours were offered throughout 2013, and it was eventually inaugurated in 2014 by the princes of Spain. It became an official botanical garden in 2015. Today it is open daily and visited by locals and tourists, with thriving school programs and regular exchanges with other institutions.

Buildings and facilities 

 The entrance building has a reception with a small shop and the exhibit hall with a palm museum. Offices are located on the upper floor. A tower with a spiral staircase and an elevator links the entrance with a bridge to the gardens.
 The octagon, El Octógono, is a half-sunken shade house of 2.300 m², designed to host the most delicate species. It contains a dense display of tropical plants, crossed by winding paths, streams, bridges, and waterfalls.
 The Ethnographical Palm Museum is a semisubterranean structure, partly covered in vegetation. This building is unfinished and still closed. It will host the existing collection of palm-related objects and dry specimens, lecture room.

Living collections 

As of 2016, the plant collection includes at least 1853 plant taxa, with focus on island floras. 420 plant taxa are in the IUCN red list: 73 are critically endangered and 2 extinct in the wild.

The palm collection has 573 taxa. 163 are represented by at least one adult. 192 taxa are in the IUCN red list and 38 of them are critically endangered; 42 "IUCN palms" reached the adult stage.

Other well-represented families are Amaryllidaceae, Asparagaceae, Apocynaceae, Bromeliaceae, Fabaceae,  Malvaceae and Moraceae.

The collection focuses on palms from islands and the Caribbean species are the most represented.  The collection of Thrinax, Coccothrinax and Hemithrinax is one of the most complete in the world, as it proceeds from numerous field expeditions and collaborations with botanical gardens in the Caribbean, especially with La Habana, Cienfuegos and Las Tunas in Cuba, the Montgomery Botanical Center in Miami and the Jardín Botánico Nacional de Santo Domingo.

Some taxa are grown in sufficient number to allow ex situ seed production of IUCN species. An outstanding case is Coccothrinax borhidiana, which is a slow and critically endangered species, represented in the palmetum by 17 specimens germinated in 1996, now fruiting in the Caribbean section.

Biogeographical sections 

The surface of the hill is divided in "biogeographical sections", in order to host the palm flora from different areas of the world. They are variable in size between 1.000 and 20.000 m². Some sections are landscaped with hills, streams, ponds or waterfalls. Sections are listed below with some of the most significant species represented.
 Thermophilous scrub of the Canary Islands: Anaga. This is the large North-facing slope of the hill, planted with the local flora native to the neighbouring mountain chain of Anaga. There are all types of native species, including narrow endemics and native trees, and abundant Canary Islands date palms, Phoenix canariensis. 
 Madagascar. This large section includes a wide pond with mangroves and Typhonodorum lindleyanum.  A large group of Bismarckia nobilis tower above the rest. Remarkable palms are the large group of Ravenea xerophila grown in a rockery and three Tahina spectabilis, there are different Ravenea, Beccariophoenix, and Dypsis species .An adult baobab sown in 1996, Adansonia za, grows by the lake, and other endemic trees have been planted in the area, such as Delonix species.
 Caribbean Islands. It is the largest of all sections and includes the main square of the park, surrounded by royal palms, with a large waterfall built with local rocks, pouring water into a pond surrounded by fair sand and coconut palms. It is one of the largest collections in the world of Caribbean palms with a special focus on the genus Coccothrinax. Two species of Hemithrinax thrive here: H. ekmaniana and H. compacta.
 South America. A straight road follows the stream, planted with some large Attalea and Syagrus of different species, and a representation of the most significant South American palms, including the popular Pejibaye, Bactris gasipaes and Açai, Euterpe oleracea. 
 Central America. A small section by the lake, where the largest trees are Sabal mauritiiformis and Swietenia macrophylla
 New Caledonia. This section overlooks the ocean, with a grove of 50 Araucaria columnaris sown in 2001. There is a grove of red leaf palms, Chambeyronia macrocarpa, and a significant collection of palms and trees endemic to New Caledonia, including Pandanus and conifers of different species. There is also a collection of food crops from the Pacific islands.
 Melanesia. A small section with palms chiefly native to Fiji and Vanuatu. Large adult palms are Carpoxylon, Veitchia vitiensis and Pritchardia pacifica. Other interesting palms are Metroxylon vitiense and Pelagodoxa henryana, growing by two breadnut trees, nonis and other trees and shrubs.
 Hawaii. Different species of the only Hawaiian palm genus Pritchardia, grow with other Hawaiian endemics, like Acacia koa, Erythrina sandwicensis, Hawaiian cotton and different Hawaiian hibiscus.
 Australia. Most Australian palm genera are represented in this section and two enormous Corypha utan are the largest palms in the palmetum.

 Asia. The main features are a majestic specimen of Ficus religiosa, a path overlooking the ocean with coconut palms and the huge leaves of Corypha umbraculifera. Many Asian palm genera are represented and a collection of uncommon banana trees is scattered through this section.
 Africa. Many Oil Palms (Elaeis guineensis), and the most iconic African palms: Raphia, Borassus, and Hyphaene, but also other genera, including Medemia.
 Mascarene Islands. A small strip, with mature specimens of the genera Acanthophoenix, Hyophorbe, Latania and Dictyosperma.
 Biogeographical Sections of New Guinea and of Borneo and Philippines were started in 2007-2008 and are not yet open to the public.

References

External links 

 Official website of the Palmetum of Santa Cruz de Tenerife
 The Palmetum of Santa Cruz de Tenerife
 The Jardin Botanico del Palmetum de Santa Cruz

Santa Cruz de Tenerife
Palmetum
Botanical gardens in the Canary Islands
Protected areas of Tenerife
Protected areas established in 1995
1995 establishments in Spain